Hanieh Bavali (born 1990 in Abadan) is an Iranian female filmmaker and screenwriter.

She is most known for her first short film The Passport, which won the Creativity Award at A Show For A Change film festival in California and the Audience award of Ongezien Kort festival in Belgium.

References

External links 
 https://cinemacenter.org/hobnobben-selected-films-2019/the-passport 

Living people
1990 births
Iranian film directors
Persian-language film directors
Iranian women film directors